Rathfarnham is a Southside suburb of Dublin, Ireland. It is south of Terenure, east of Templeogue, and is in the postal districts of Dublin 14 and 16. It is within the administrative areas of both Dún Laoghaire–Rathdown County Council and South Dublin County Council.

Located within the historical baronies of Rathdown and Uppercross, Rathfarnham village originally developed around a fortification overlooking a ford on the River Dodder. From the medieval period, Rathfarnham was on the perimeter of the Pale (the area of Anglo-Norman influence in Ireland, centred on Dublin]]), and a number of defensive structures were built in the area. Rathfarnham Castle, a fortified house, was built in the late 16th century. Developed around these structures, by the 19th century there were a number of mills operating in the area, and Rathfarnham was still somewhat rural by the early 20th century. During the 20th century, with the expansion of metropolitan Dublin, Rathfarnham became a largely residential suburban area.

Location
Rathfarnham is a civil parish in the historical baronies of Rathdown and Uppercross. The civil parish contains 11 townlands. Historical sites in Rathfarnham's townlands include: Kilmashogue, Mount Venus, Tibradden and Taylors Grange. A broad definition of Rathfarnham also includes the suburban areas of Nutgrove, Ballyboden, Whitechurch and Ballyroan.

History

Early and medieval history
The name Rathfarnham (Fearnáin's Ringfort) suggests an earlier habitation, but no remains of prehistoric fortifications, burial places, early churches or old records have been found.

The written history of Rathfarnham begins after the Norman invasion of Ireland. Terenure and Kimmage (Cheming), both described as being in  parish Dublin, are mentioned in an 1175 grant by Henry II to Walter the goldsmith ('Aurifaber') held at Canterbury Cathedral Archives.

In 1199, these lands were granted to Milo le Bret, and he adapted an existing ridge to build a motte and bailey fort at what is now the start of the Braemor Road. Le Bret later established a more permanent fortified settlement on the site of the (later) Rathfarnham Castle and a village grew up around it on a site overlooking a ford over the River Dodder.

In the 13th century, no events of great importance are recorded as Rathfarnham, perhaps as it was protected on its south side by the Royal Forest of Glencree. Rathfarnham became more exposed to an attack when this deer park was overrun by the Clan O'Toole from the Wicklow Mountains in the 14th century.

Located on the perimeter of the Pale (the area around Dublin under greater English control), when the English presence began to shrink after the 14th century, Rathfarnham "came to be on the front lines" and a number of defensive structures were built to protect the area from incursions by Gaelic Irish families.

From the 16th century
 
The site of Rathfarnham Castle, and much of the land around Rathfarnham, belonged to the Eustace family, Viscounts of Baltinglass. However, their property was confiscated, from James Eustace, 3rd Viscount Baltinglass, for his support of the Second Desmond Rebellion of 1579-1583. The Eustace lands at Rathfarnham were then granted to the Loftus family, who built a fortified house on the site of an earlier structure.

In the 1640s, the Loftus family was at the centre of the Irish Confederate Wars arising out of the Irish Rebellion of 1641. In 1649, the castle was seized by the Earl of Ormonde's Catholic and Royalist forces before the Battle of Rathmines. However, they were granted it back by the English parliamentarians after their victory in that battle. Reputedly, Oliver Cromwell stayed in Rathfarnham Castle on his way south to the Siege of Wexford.

Economic activity in Rathfarnham was stepped up in the 17th century, and the village was granted a patent in 1618 to hold horse and cattle fairs. From the early 18th century a number of gentlemen's residences were developed, including the remodelling of Rathfarnham Castle and the construction of Ashfield.

Rathfarnham Castle

 
Rathfarnham Castle itself was re-modelled from a defensively focused fortified house into a more comfortable stately home. Lower Dodder Road is still marked by a triumphal arch, from this era, which originally led to the castle. The erection of this gateway is attributed to Henry Loftus, Earl of Ely from 1769 to 1783 who was also responsible for the classical work on the castle itself. The arch is named the "new gate" on Frizell's map of 1779. After the division of the estate in 1913, the arch became the entrance to the Castle Golf Club but was later abandoned in favour of the more direct Woodside Drive entrance. The area around the arch is a haven for wildlife, with the nearby River Dodder home to brown trout, otter and many birds including kingfisher, dipper and grey heron. Woodside Estate is home to red fox, rabbits and grey squirrels.

Ashfield
Ashfield, the next house on the same side, was occupied during the 18th century by Protestant clergy. In the early part of the 19th century, it became the home of Sir William Cusac Smith, Baron of the Exchequer and from 1841 of the Tottenham family who continued in residence until 1913. After this the Brooks of Brooks Thomas Ltd. occupied it until the 1990s when the estate was divided up and houses built along the main road. A new road was later built along the side of the house and named Brookvale after the last occupants.

Industrial revolution
New industries, especially the production of paper, developed on the Owendoher and Dodder rivers, and many mills were erected during the 18th and 19th centuries. During the 19th century, a number of them switched to cotton and wool and later were converted to flour mills. The introduction of steam engines marked the end of this era and replaced the need for mills. Many of the old buildings fell into disrepair and were demolished, and their millraces filled in.

A millpond and extensive mill buildings formerly occupied the low-lying fields on the west side of the main Rathfarnham road, just beside the bridge. On a map by Frizell dated 1779, it is called the "Widow Clifford's mill and mill holding" and in 1843 it is named the "Ely Cloth Factory". A Mr Murray then owned it but in 1850, it passed into the hands of Mr Nickson who converted it into a flour mill. His family continued in occupation until 1875 when John Lennox took over. In 1880 this mill closed down, the buildings were demolished and not a trace now remains.

Historical features

Military Road

Rathfarnham is the start of the Military Road. This road through the Wicklow Mountains (still in use mainly for tourist traffic) was built at the beginning of the 19th century to open up the Wicklow Mountains to the British Army to assist them in putting down the insurgents who were hiding there following the Irish Rebellion of 1798. Rathfarnham itself was the scene of some skirmishes in the early days of the Rising which extended to the final battle in "Raheen" (now Raheen City) in County Wexford.

Construction commenced on 12 August 1800 and was completed in October 1809. The road starts outside the Yellow House, passes the head of Glencree, with a spur down that valley to Enniskerry, rises to the Sally Gap and then dips down to Laragh, over the hills into Glenmalure, and finishes at Aghavannagh. Well-known sections also include the Featherbed Mountain, the section below Kippure Mountain. The total distance was 34 Irish Miles, of which the spur to Enniskerry was 5 Irish Miles. The engineer in charge was Alexander Taylor (born in 1746), who was responsible for many other roads in the country, including some "Turnpike Roads", which are Toll Roads.

Rathfarnham Road
According to many writers, the road to Rathfarnham follows the same route as the Slíghe Chualann, the ancient highway, which in the time of Saint Patrick was used by travellers between Dublin, Wicklow and Wexford. This road is believed to have crossed the Dodder at the Big Bridge, now Pearse Bridge, and re-crossed it again near Oldbawn, an unnecessarily inconvenient route, considering that a road through Templeogue to Oldbawn would not necessitate any crossing. The first record of a bridge being built here was in 1381 and in 1652 it was described by Gerard Boate in his A Natural History of Ireland as a wooden bridge which 'though it be high and strong nevertheless hath several times been quite broke and carried away through the violence of sudden floods.' After three bridges had been demolished by the river, between 1728 and 1765, the present structure of a single stone arch was erected in the latter year. This was widened on the west side in 1953 when it was renamed in commemoration of Patrick and William Pearse.

Cut into the surface of the stone were a number of deep parallel grooves, as from the action of wheeled traffic over a long period. This was evidence of the existence here of a busy thoroughfare even before the construction of the earliest bridge.

Old graveyard
Next to Ashfield is the old graveyard containing the ruins of a church that was dedicated to Saints Peter and Paul. This was a medieval church used for Protestant worship until 1795 when it was found to be too small for the congregation and a new one was erected a short way off. The end walls of the old church still stand, the west gable containing a bell turret and the east pierced by a chancel arch, however, the chancel itself has disappeared. The north wall is gone and all that remains of the south wall is an arched opening.

Near the entrance to the burial ground is the grave of Captain James Kelly, an old Fenian who was associated with the Fenian Rising of 1867. He was the organiser for the Rathfarnham district and was known in the area as 'The Knight of Glendoo'. On one occasion when he was on the run he was hiding in the cellar of his business premises in Wicklow Street when police raided it. An employee named James Fitzpatrick who strongly resembled Capt. Kelly in appearance was arrested in error and was tried and sentenced to six months imprisonment, which he served without betraying his identity. Capt. Kelly died on 8 March 1915, aged 70.

On the opposite side of the road are Crannagh Park and Road, Rathfarnham Park and Ballytore Road, all built on part of the old Rathfarnham Estate. In the garden of a house formerly named Tower Court in Crannagh Road is an ancient circular pigeon house, a relic of Lord Ely's occupation of Rathfarnham Castle. The entrance to this curious structure is by a low door on a level with the ground and the inside is lined from floor to roof with holes for the pigeons. A later floor was inserted halfway up, so as to make two rooms, and a second door was broken through the wall at that level.

Rathfarnham village

In the castle grounds were several fish ponds which were supplied by a mill race taken from the stream which rises up at Kilmashogue and flows down through Grange Golf Club and Saint Enda's Park. This served several mills before entering the fish ponds, whence it ran through the golf links while a smaller branch was conducted under the road to the flour mills which stood at the corner of Butterfield Lane, on the site later occupied by Borgward Hansa Motors Ltd. Described in 1836 as Sweetman's Flour Mills, it frequently changed hands before closing down in 1887. It was later operated as a sawmill. The dry mill race can still be seen here on the north side of Butterfield Avenue.

Rathfarnham's Protestant parish church, on the Main Street, was built in 1795 to replace the church in the old graveyard. Beside the church is the old schoolhouse that dates from early in the nineteenth century. Immediately adjoining is Church Lane at the corner of which is a bank built on the site of a Royal Irish Constabulary barracks that was burned down by Anti-Treaty IRA forces in September 1922 during the Irish Civil War. In the lane is an old blocked-up doorway of an early eighteenth-century type. Church Lane leads to Woodview cottages, which are built partly on the site of an old paper mill. The mill race previously mentioned passed under Butterfield Lane to the paper mill and continued on below Ashfield to turn the wheel of the Ely Cloth Factory. It was later turned into the Owen Doher River at Woodview Cottages. Until recently, when the new road was made to Templeogue, the old mill race could still be traced through the grounds of Ashfield where its dry bed was still spanned by several stone bridges.

The paper mill, of which some old walls and brick arches still survive, has been described as the oldest in Ireland but there does not appear to be any evidence to support this. The earliest reference to a paper mill here is 1719 when William Lake of Rathfarnham presented a petition for financial aid but we hear of one at Milltown as far back as 1694. In 1751 William and Thomas Slater whose works were destroyed by fire in 1775 made paper here. Archer's survey of 1801 mentions two paper mills here, Freemans and Teelings, and both Dalton in 1836 and Lewis in 1837 state that one paper mill was still working and from 1836 to 1839 the name Henry Hayes, Rathfarnham Mill appears in the directories. If this can be identified with the mill at Woodview cottages it must have become idle soon afterwards as it is designated "Old Mill" on the 1843 edition of the O.S. map. In 1854 when this mill had neither a water wheel nor machinery, an attempt was made to re-open it for the manufacture of paper but it came to nothing. The mill race has now been completely removed to make way for a housing development.

At the end of the main street, on the right, the road to Lower Rathfarnham passes the site of the earliest Constabulary barracks. This closed down in 1890 when the establishment was transferred to a house named Leighton Lodge near Loreto Abbey.

Rathfarnham Lower
The Catholic Church of the Annunciation was erected in 1878 to replace the old chapel on Willbrook Road. Outside the church door is a primitive type of font on a pedestal bearing the inscription FONT USED IN MASS HOUSE OF PENAL TIMES IN PARISH OF RATHFARNHAM FROM 1732. The appearance of this font would suggest that it was originally a stone bullaun dating back to a period much earlier than the penal times.

On the opposite corner is the well-known Yellow House, a licensed premises built near the site of an inn of the same name which is marked on Taylor's map of 1816. (The Catholic Church of the Annunciation (see above) is on the site of the original Yellow House). A tradition has been recorded by Mr Hammond that in 1798 a Michael Eades, who sheltered wanted men in his house, owned it. It was also frequented by the soldiers of the Rathfarnham Guard whose careless talk was carefully noted by the United Irishmen hiding on the premises. In 1804, when the truth came to be known, the same military wrecked the place. Following Wilbrook road down between the Yellow House and the Annunciation, a large set of wrought iron gates can be observed. These gates, which now act as the pedestrian entrance to the Beaufort Downs housing estate, were originally the entrance to the Beaufort estate of the 18th century.

Nutgrove Avenue
A short distance past the church is Nutgrove Avenue, widened and extended during the 1960s to link up with Churchtown. The old quiet tree-shaded avenue has been completely swept away, along with the narrow lanes, a cramped passage bounded on both sides by towering walls and full of right-angled bends, which wended its crooked course between Loreto Convent cemetery and the garden of Nutgrove House. A massive gateway stood at the entrance to this avenue until about 1911, which bore the inscription Nutgrove School Established 1802. In 1839 the school was under the supervision of Mr Philip Jones, who continued to hold the post of principal until 1866 when the position was held by Mrs Anne Jones. In 1876 the school closed down and the house was occupied as a private residence by various tenants becoming the parish council headquarters. The new avenue was laid through the former school grounds and the house, shorn of its ornamental gardens, stood with its front against the footpath. At some time the house had been disfigured with a rather unsightly concrete porch and the old brickwork covered with cement plaster, concealing the fact that this was a very interesting eighteenth-century building containing fine stairs and coved ceilings with good plaster decoration. Unfortunately, the house fell into very bad repair and eventually was demolished. Weston St John Joyce, in his Neighbourhood of Dublin, states that this house was at one time the dower house of Rathfarnham Castle but in this, he is almost certainly mistaken, as Frizell's map of 1779 shows that it was outside the estate. It is possible that he confused it with the other old house on the opposite side of the avenue which was formerly named Ely Cottage, later altered to Ely Lodge, and which was shown to be within the boundary of the estate. This house was in very bad repair but has recently been restored.

Loreto Abbey
Loreto Abbey in Lower Rathfarnham forms a landmark visible for a number of miles south of the city. It served as the headquarters of the Institute of the Blessed Virgin Mary.

The mansion which now forms the centrepiece of the group was built by Mr. William Palliser about 1725. No expense was spared in its construction and decoration, and its interior includes polished mahogany and, in one room, embossed leather wallpaper. William Palliser died in 1768 without issue and Rathfarnham House passed to his cousin the Rev. John Palliser, who was rector of the parish.

After his death in 1795 the house was purchased by George Grierson, the King's Printer in Ireland, who resided here for a few years. When Grierson moved to his new abode in Woodtown in 1800 the house remained unoccupied until 1821, when it was purchased by the Most Rev. Dr Murray for the newly founded Loreto Order.

The foundress Rev. Mother Mary Teresa Ball made a number of improvements to the place. She is said to have added a storey to the old house although there is no evidence from the exterior to support this. Many additions have been made over the years, the church was built in 1840, the novitiate in 1863 and six years later St Joseph's wing which contains the concert hall and refectory. St Anthony's wing was erected in 1896, St Francis Xavier's in 1903 and the Lisieux building in 1932 for the accommodation of visiting prelates to the Eucharistic Congress. In the 1920s, novice Agnes Bojaxhiu (later to become Mother Teresa) came to Loreto Abbey to learn English. This was the language the Sisters of Loreto used to teach school children in India.

Directly across the road from the Abbey is Beaufort House, which is now the headquarters of the Loreto Order in Ireland. This house was occupied by Robert Hodgens J.P. (1793–1860) and then by his sons, John Conlan Hodgens and Henry Hodgens. On the grounds is Loreto High School Beaufort which was founded in 1925.

The Ponds
Loreto Terrace on the north side of the Abbey was formerly known as 'The Ponds', a name originating apparently from the large pond which two hundred years ago occupied the low-lying field between Loreto Terrace and Nutgrove Avenue. This area was described in Weston St John Joyce's The Neighbourhood of Dublin in 1912 as "the dilapidated locality known as the Ponds" but it has since been largely rebuilt. An old photograph from Larry O'Connor's collection shows what it looked like at that time. The last of the old houses were demolished in the mid-1980s. It was a very early 18th-century gabled residence named Grove Cottage.

This place was the scene of a skirmish at the outbreak of the rising of 1798. The insurgents of the south county assembled at the Ponds on 24 May 1798 under the leadership of David Keely, James Byrne, Edward Keogh and Ledwich. The latter two had been members of Lord Ely's yeomanry but had taken to the field with the United Irishmen. The insurgents were attacked by the local yeomanry corps but were able to defend themselves and the yeomanry was forced to retreat. A party of regular troops was then sent against them and a stiff encounter took place. A number of the insurgents were killed or wounded and some prisoners were taken including Keogh and Ledwich. The survivors retreated, joining up with a party from Clondalkin, and a further engagement took place at the turnpike on the Rathcoole road where the enemy was successfully repulsed.

Harold's Grange and Taylors Grange
The road to Harold's Grange continues southward from Loreto Abbey. The first site is Snugborough, which has its gable end to the road. The next is Washington Lodge, its 18th-century facade hidden by shrubbery. In later years new avenues have been laid out here on both sides of the road. Barton Drive, on the left, occupies the site of a house named Barton Lodge (occupied by William Conlan, a brewer in Dublin, until his death in 1829 - his daughter married into the local Hodgens family, who in the 1870s donated the lands for the Church of the Annunciation). On the other side is Silveracre, once the home of Dr Henthorn Todd, Professor of Hebrew in Trinity College, who was connected by marriage to the Hudson family of the adjoining Hermitage estate. He died here in 1869. About the middle of the last century, the name of the house was changed to Silverton but it was later reverted to the original Silveracre. Most of the land is now built on. It was also the home in the early part of the twentieth century of Surgeon Croly, who founded Baggot St Hospital.

St Enda's

The next estate on the same side is Hermitage or Saint Enda's, the former home of Patrick Pearse and later of his sister Margaret Mary Pearse. The house, which is entirely faced with cut granite and has an imposing stone portico, was occupied in the eighteenth century by Edward Hudson, an eminent dentist. He had a passion for Irish antiquities, which he demonstrated in an unusual way by the erection of a number of romantic ruins around the estate. He built a small watchtower inside the boundary wall near the entrance gate and further along, a hermit's cave, a dolmen, a ruined abbey and beside a deep well, a tiny chamber with a stone bench and a narrow fireplace. At the corner of the road to Whitechurch the loopholed and crenulated structure, known as the "Fortification" or "Emmet's Fort" was another of his creations. South of the house, he built a grotto surmounted by a tall stone pillar, a Brehon's Chair and a fanciful construction consisting of two great boulders, one balanced on top of the other, which has since been demolished. Just inside the boundary wall, he cut an inscription in Ogham on the two faces of a large rock. Translated they read: RIDENT VICINI GLEBASETS A KH A MOVENTEM EDUARDUM HUDSON. In the pretty glen adjoining the Whitechurch road he erected a sort of temple with several small chambers and flights of steps. The estate was at that time known as the "Fields of Oden" and is so-called on maps of the period. Within the grounds also, at the corner nearest to Whitechurch is an obelisk, stated to have been erected by a former owner, Major Doyne, over the grave of a horse that carried him through the Battle of Waterloo. The date however of Major Doyne's occupation does not support this. Meanwhile, Pádraig Pearse wrote in An Macaomh that "a monument in the wood, beyond the little lake, is said to mark the spot where a horse of Sarah Curran's was killed and is buried." Unlike the constructions of Edward Hudson, which were purposely of the roughest material, this monument was of cut stone with small moulded pillars. After having been vandalized and toppled, it has since been re-erected without the pillars which were broken.

Edward Hudson was succeeded by his son William Elliot Hudson, who was born here in 1796. A distinguished scholar, he was a friend of Thomas Davis and Charles Gavan Duffy and was a patron of Irish literature and art. Shortly before his death in 1857, he endowed the Royal Irish Academy with a fund for the publication of its Irish Dictionary and he also left the Academy Library a valuable collection of books.

From 1840 to 1858 Hermitage was the home of Richard Moore, Attorney General, and in 1859 it came into the possession of Major Richard Doyne, stated to be a veteran of the Waterloo. From 1872 to 1885 it was occupied by George Campbell, merchant of 58 Sackville St., and after lying vacant for a few years it was tenanted by Major Philip Doyne of the 4th Dragoon Guards. In 1891 Colonel Frederick le Mesurier, a barrister returned as occupier and in 1899 Mr. William Woodburn.

St Enda's School was founded by Padraig Pearse in 1909 and was at first housed in Cullenswood House, Ranelagh. Pearse felt that the confined surroundings of this house gave no scope for the outdoor life that should play so large a part in the education of youth, so in 1910 he leased Hermitage from Mr Woodburn and moved his college here. A long billiard room was converted into a study hall and chapel, the drawing room became a dormitory and the stables opening off an enclosed square became classrooms. In "The Story of a Success" Pearse tells of the realisation of one of his life's ambitions and it was from here that he set off for the city on his bicycle for the last time on Easter Sunday 1916. After the rising, the college continued to function under the care of Margaret Pearse until it finally closed down in 1935. After the death of Margaret Pearse in 1968 St Enda's passed into the hands of the state and has since been opened as a public park and home of the Pearse Museum.

Priory
Directly opposite St Enda's was Priory, the home of John Philpot Curran, at the time of Emmet's rising. The house was formerly named Holly Park but when Curran bought it in 1790 he changed the name to Priory. He lived here for 27 years at the peak of his fame and here he was to endure the tragic events, which cast a shadow on his private life. First, the untimely death of his daughter Gertrude, followed by the loss of his wife, who left him for another man, and lastly the discovery of the association of his daughter Sarah Curran with Robert Emmet. Gertrude Curran died in 1792 at the age of 12 as the result of a fall from a window. Curran had her buried in the grounds of the Priory and over the grave, he placed a recumbent slab, on which was fixed a metal plate bearing the inscription:

Here lies the body of Gertrude Curran
fourth daughter of John Philpot Curran
who departed this life October 6, 1792
Age twelve years.

The position of the grave was clearly marked on the early editions of the O.S. maps. It was about midway along the northern boundary of the corner field facing the fortification, on the north side of the boundary bank and a few yards from it. It was formerly enclosed by a grove of trees, which can be seen in J. J. Reynold's photograph of 1903 but these were cut down about 1928. Sometime later the stumps were dug out and the stone slab broken up and thrown on the adjoining bank. The metal plate had already been taken by souvenir hunters. It was Sarah Curran's desire to be buried here also but to this her father would not agree as he had come in for criticism on the previous occasion for burying his daughter in unconsecrated ground.

In this district nearly every ancient site is associated in tradition with either Sarah Curran or Robert Emmet and it has been suggested as the last resting place of Robert Emmet. In October 1979 The Hermitage estate was being developed and heavy machinery moved in to lay the roads and sewers. A Mrs Bernadette Foley of nearby Barton Drive drew attention to the need to carry out this work before the site was buried forever under a concrete jungle. With the co-operation of Messrs Gallaghers, the developers, a small group undertook to investigate the site. The result was a complete blank. A second and a third trenches were cut at intervals until a large area had been investigated without finding any burial, timber, brick or stone.

They then deepened this area by another two feet with no better result. All the accounts of the burial state that it was made in a vault and it is therefore surprising and disappointing that no evidence whatever was found and there does not seem to be any obvious explanation for it. The builders, Messrs Gallaghers Ltd. were commended for their interest in this aspect of the site and their painstaking excavation work under the supervision of Mr Leslie Black was expertly carried out.

The priory was occupied by the Curran family until 1875 and subsequently by the Taylors until 1923. At the beginning of the century, the house and gardens were still in good repair but after Taylor's time, the place was neglected. Twenty years ago the walls were still standing but little now remains but some heaps of rubble.

St Columba's College
St Columba's College is a privately run, Church of Ireland co-educational boarding school with c. 300 pupils. It was founded in 1843 by the then Primate of Ireland, Rev. William Sewell. In 1849 the college moved from Stackallan House in County Meath to its present site in Whitechurch, Rathfarnham. The headmaster of the college is addressed as 'warden' and the vice-principal as 'sub-warden'. The college school day is split up during the winter - school classes end at 13:00 and there are games and other outdoor activities after lunch from 14:00 to 15:30. Classes recommence at 16:15 and continue until 18:00. The school week consists of five days from Monday to Saturday with Wednesday and Saturday being half-days. The college has a very high academic profile but it also focuses considerable attention on music, drama and art. The college caters for a wide range of academic abilities and provides an excellent special-needs service for children with mild learning deficits. The geographical layout of the college does not accommodate or facilitate wheelchairs.

Features
Rathfarnham is home to several notable historic buildings, including Rathfarnham Castle and Loreto Abbey, four parks: Marlay Park, Dodder Park, St Enda's and Bushy Park, and several pubs including The Eden, Buglers, Revels and the landmark Yellow House. Padraig Pearse established St Enda's School for Boys, which is now a museum in his honour situated in Saint Enda's Park.

Amenities
Rathfarnham has a number of shops and businesses, including two bank branches, notably in the Nutgrove Shopping Centre. The area's other shopping centre is the small Rathfarnham Shopping Centre. The area also has a Garda Station and two post offices and is home to the city's main animal shelter.

Marlay Park is a large open parkland, with a craft centre near the old "big house"; the park hosts concerts every year. Aside from St Enda's, Dodder Park and Bushy Park (see above), Loreto park and small green spaces, the area also hosts two golf clubs.

Education
There are six schools in Rathfarnham: St Marys BNS, Loreto High School, Loreto Primary, Gaelcholáiste an Phiarsaigh, Rathfarnham Parish National School and Educate Together Rathfarnham.

Organisations and sport

Rathfarnham is home to the 13th Dublin, the 14th Dublin, the 31st Dublin (which was founded in 1917) and the 68th Dublin Scout troops and the Rathfarnham Girl Guides The area is also home to the Rathfarnham Concert Band.

For Gaelic games, there is the Ballinteer St John's GAA Club, and also Ballyboden St. Enda's GAA which is one of the largest GAA clubs in Ireland. Rathfarnham has a number of soccer teams including Nutgrove Celtic, Rathfarnham Punters, Rathfarnham Rovers, Leicester Celtic, Broadford Rovers and Whitechurch United.

Rathfarnham is also home to a number of boxing clubs and to Rathfarnham WSAF Athletic Club.

Demographics
According to the 2006 Census, Rathfarnham has a population of 17,333 – a drop of 2.1% since 2002. The population has gradually decreased over the years from 17,760 in 1996 to 17,717 in 2002.

The number of people living around the neighbourhoods of Ballyroan and St Endas fell by 8% and 7% respectively. On the other hand, there were minimal increases in the Butterfield and Hermitage areas.

Culture and entertainment

Music
Between May and August every year, concerts are held in Marlay Park. Acts to play the venue in 2007 included Damien Rice, Foo Fighters, Kaiser Chiefs, Crowded House, Aerosmith, Damien Rice, The Who and Peter Gabriel. Muse, The Killers, Lenny Kravitz/Alanis Morissette played in the park during 2008 Metallica, Fatboy Slim, Dizzee Rascal and Calvin Harris played there in August 2009. Marley Park has also hosted the Longitude Festival every July since 2013.

Film location
A number of films have shot some of their scenes in Rathfarnham. The opening scene in Intermission was recorded at Rathfarnham Shopping Centre. In one scene in the movie Ordinary Decent Criminal, a car is blown up in front of the Pearse Museum in St Enda's Park. The Secret Scripture was filmed in Loreto Abbey, Rathfarnham in 2015.

Pubs

Pubs in the area include the "Buglers" pub in Ballyboden House on Ballyboden Road in Ballyboden. John Blake was the first known publican to be granted the licence in 1799. On Rathfarnham's main street, near Rathfarnham Castle, is "The Castle Inn".

"The Eden House" pub is on Grange Road near Marlay Park. The building was formerly "Eden House", one of the 18th century stately houses on Grange Road, before being converted to its present use. The pub was then sold in 2006 for €5.5m, renovated, and is now run by owners of The Morgue Pub in Templeogue Village. "The Old Orchard" is on Butterfield Avenue near Rathfarnham Shopping Centre. "The Blue Haven" is situated at the junction of Ballyroan Road and Butterfield Avenue.

"The Yellow House", is at the corner of Willbrook Road and Grange Road, a short distance from Rathfarnham Castle. It is believed that the first pub bearing the name was a thatched cottage standing on the site of the present Catholic church and that the licence went back as far as the early eighteenth century. A new Yellow House was built in 1825 and opened for business in 1827. The current building dates from 1885. It was refurbished and extended in 1979. According to local folklore, the poet Francis Ledwidge worked there for two days as an apprentice before homesickness for his home town of Slane, County Meath, caused him to leave.

Transport
Rathfarnham is served by the Dublin Bus route numbers 16 (Ballinteer to Dublin Airport via Dublin city centre), 15B (Stocking Avenue to Grand Canal Dock via the city centre), 17 (to UCD), 61 (to Eden Quay), 75 (to Tallaght) and 161 (to Rockbrook). The 16 route was the first bus route in Dublin to have free Internet Wi-Fi onboard.

In 2007, it was proposed that a Luas tram line (mentioned in a feasibility study as 'Line E') would be routed through Rathfarnham. However, it was found that the proposal would not be feasible, as road widening would be required, necessitating the compulsory purchase of a significant number of homes and gardens on the route. Because of this, the project was not progressed.

Notable people

See also
 List of abbeys and priories in Ireland (County Dublin)
 List of castles in Ireland
 List of towns and villages in Ireland

References

External links

South Dublin County Council
Rathfarnham community website
South Dublin County History
South Dublin County Images

 
Towns and villages in Dún Laoghaire–Rathdown
Towns and villages in South Dublin (county)
Civil parishes of Rathdown, County Dublin